Yeniköy is a village in Tarsus district of Mersin Province, Turkey. It is situated in the Taurus Mountains to the west of Turkish state highway . The population of Yeniköy was 178. as of 2012.

References

Villages in Tarsus District